Micha Cárdenas, stylized as micha cárdenas, is an American visual and performance artist who is an assistant professor of art and design, specializing in game studies and playable media, at the University of California Santa Cruz. Cárdenas is an artist and theorist who works with the algorithms and poetics of trans people of color in digital media.

Artwork and performances
Cárdenas has presented her work around the world, including keynote performances at the 2015 Association of Internet Researchers Conference, 2014 Digital Gender workshop at Umeå University in Sweden, 2013 Dark Side of the Digital Conference and 2012 Allied Media Conference, performances at the 2012 Zero1 Biennial in San Jose, and the Hemispheric Institute of Performance and Politics 7th Encuentro in Bogotá, Colombia and collective exhibitions at the 2010 California Biennial, and the 2009 Mérida Biennial. In 2008, cardenas performed Becoming Dragon, a 365 hour mixed reality performance in Second Life.  Recent projects include  "Unstoppable" (a collaboration with Patrisse Cullors, Chris Head and Edxie Betts to create no-cost bulletproof clothing), Local Autonomy Networks,  and virus.circus (a collaboration with Elle Mehrmand). She has curated exhibits in Los Angeles, New York, and Tijuana. cárdenas' work Sin Sol, Forest Memory (2018) created in collaboration with Abraham Avnisan, was included in the group exhibition, “Between Bodies,” curated by Nina Bozicnik, at the Henry Art Gallery, University of Washington, Seattle, October 27, 2018 — April 28, 2019 and reviewed in Art in America, March, 2019 and The Seattle Times, January, 2019.

As a member of the Electronic Disturbance Theater/b.a.n.g. lab, cárdenas helped design the Transborder Immigrant Tool, a GPS device designed to guide immigrants illegally crossing the US-Mexico border and to help them find water stations during their journey. cardenas argued the aim of this project was "about giving water to somebody who's dying in the desert of dehydration." Critics claimed the project was an irresponsible use of government funds, and a tool that would assist illegal activity, such as smuggling. Ultimately, all investigations of the project were dropped without finding any misuse of funds or illegal activity on the part of the artists.

Books and writings

Cárdenas's first book, co-authored with Barbara Fornssler in 2010, Trans Desire / Affective Cyborgs, discusses an experimental conception of politics based in desire.

In 2012, Cárdenas co-authored The Transreal: Political Aesthetics of Crossing Realities, co-edited by Zach Blas, was published by Atropos Press. The book discusses art, games and activism that use multiple realities, including augmented reality, mixed reality, and alternate reality approaches. In 2013, cárdenas's poetry and a statement on poetics was published in the anthology Troubling the Line: Trans and Genderqueer Poetry and Poetics by Nightboat Books. The editors describe the book as the first anthology of transgender and genderqueer poetry. In 2014, Cárdenas published an essay titled "Movements of Safety" in the book Plants, Androids and Operators: A Post-Media Handbook by Mute Publishing. The book includes essays from numerous theorists and artists working in the Post-Media Lab at Leuphana University.

In 2015, her article "Shifting Futures: Digital Trans of Color Praxis" was included in Ada: A Journal of Gender, New Media, and Technology. "Redshift and Portalmetal," "Pregnancy: Reproductive Futures in Trans of Color Feminism," "QueerOS: A User’s Manual," and "Trans of Color Poetics: Stitching Bodies, Concepts, and Algorithms" were published in 2016.

In December, 2017, MIT Press published Trap Door: Trans Cultural Production and the Politics of Visibility, which contains Cárdenas's chapter "Dark Shimmers: The Rhythm of Necropolitical Affect in Digital Media. In this work, she "engages . . . a few moments of time in the months of June and July 2016, during which extreme violence against trans, black, and Latinx people occurred repeatedly, rhythmically."

Cárdenas has published several works related to the theoretical issues raised in her performances including "Becoming Dragon, A Transversal Technology Study" in the 2013 book Critical Digital Studies from University of Toronto Press, and "I Am Transreal" in the 2010 book Gender Outlaws the Next Generation, edited by Kate Bornstein and S. Bear Bergman. Additional published works include the 2010 essay "Technesexual Interface: Erotic Mixed Reality Performance," co-authored with Elle Mehrmand.

"Monstrous Children of Pregnant Androids: Latinx Futures after Orlando" was published in January, 2018.

Cárdenas' monograph Poetic Operations: Trans of Color Art in Digital Media was published by Duke University Press in 2022.

Awards

In 2020, Cárdenas's augmented reality artwork Sin Sol won the Impact Award at the Indiecade Festival of Independent Games.

In 2022, Cárdenas's book Poetic Operations was the co-winner of the Gloria E. Anzaldúa Book Prize from the National Women's Studies Association.

Teaching and research 
Previously, Cárdenas was Assistant Professor of Interactive Media Design and Interdisciplinary Arts & Sciences at the University of Washington Bothell. cárdenas was also a Lecturer in the Visual Arts Department and Critical Gender Studies Program at UCSD in 2009 and 2010. She was previously the Interim Associate Director of Art and Technology for the Culture, Art and Technology program at UCSD and a researcher at the Center for Research in Computing and the Arts, CalIT2 and the UCSD School of Medicine. cárdenas worked in the Experimental Game Lab at the Center for Research in Computing and the Arts on the Scalable City project.

Education 
Cárdenas earned her PhD at the University of Southern California in the Media Arts and Practice program where she was a Provost Fellow. She received her MFA at the University of California, San Diego in the summer of 2009. She also holds a Master's degree in Media and Communications from the European Graduate School and a Bachelor's degree in Computer Science from Florida International University.

References

External links
Cardenas' Blog
Cardenas' curated exhibitions at UCSD's Culture, Art and Technology Program

1977 births
Living people
 
American contemporary artists
New media artists
American performance artists
American women performance artists
University of California, Santa Cruz faculty
Transgender women
American LGBT artists
Transgender artists
University of California, San Diego alumni
Transgender academics
Transgender studies academics
American transgender writers